Finn Rasmussen (born 22 December 1920; date of death unknown) was a Danish sprint canoeist who competed in the late 1940s. He won a silver medal in the K-2 500 m event at the 1948 ICF Canoe Sprint World Championships in London.

Rasmussen competed at the 1948 Summer Olympics, also held in London, finishing fourth in the K-2 10000 m event. Note that the K-2 500 m event did not become an official event at the Summer Olympics until the 1976 Games in Montreal. The event has been on the Olympic program since then.

References

1920 births
Year of death missing
Canoeists at the 1948 Summer Olympics
Danish male canoeists
Olympic canoeists of Denmark
ICF Canoe Sprint World Championships medalists in kayak